All I Want is the third studio album by American country music artist Tim McGraw. It was released on September 19, 1995. The album sold over two million copies and reached the top 5 on the Billboard 200. It has been certified as 3× Multi-Platinum by the RIAA. The album's singles were, in order of release: "I Like It, I Love It", "Can't Be Really Gone", "All I Want Is a Life", "She Never Lets It Go to Her Heart" and "Maybe We Should Just Sleep on It". Respectively, these reached No. 1, No. 2, No. 5, No. 1, and No. 4 on the Billboard Hot Country Songs charts. "I Like It, I Love It" was also a No. 25 hit on the Billboard Hot 100. This was Tim's last album to have a neotraditional country sound before developing a more crossover-friendly country-pop sound.

Track listing

Charts and certifications

Weekly charts

Singles

Year-end charts

Certifications

Personnel 
 Mike Brignardello – bass
 Larry Byrom – acoustic guitar
 Steve Dorff – string arrangements and conductor 
 Glen Duncan – fiddle
 Sonny Garrish – dobro, pedal steel guitar
 Dann Huff – electric guitar
 Tim McGraw – lead vocals 
 Terry McMillan – percussion
 Steve Nathan – keyboards, Hammond B3 organ
 Matt Rollings – piano, keyboards, Hammond B3 organ
 Brent Rowan – electric guitar
 Lonnie Wilson – drums
 Glenn Worf – bass on "All I Want is a Life"
 Curtis Wright – backing vocals
 Curtis Young – backing vocals
 Nashville String Machine – string section

Production 
 Byron Gallimore – producer
 James Stroud – producer
 Missi Callis – production assistant
 Abbe Nameche – production assistant
 Stephanie Orr – production assistant
 Tamera Petrash – production assistant
 Doug Rich – production assistant

Technical 
 Julian King – recording
 Chris Lord-Alge – mixing
 Ricky Cobble – additional engineer, assistant engineer, recording assistant 
 Jerry Puckett – additional engineer
 Mark Hagen – recording assistant, mix assistant 
 Craig White – recording assistant
 Doug Sax – mastering

References 

1995 albums
Tim McGraw albums
Curb Records albums
Albums produced by Byron Gallimore
Albums produced by James Stroud